Muireadhach Ua Cárthaigh (died 1067) was Chief Poet of Connacht.

Overview

Muireadhach Ua Cárthaigh, was in 1067 "drowned in Loch Calgaich." He was described as "the chief poet and chief ollamh of Connaught." No surviving poems are known.

The Uí Cárthaigh (anglicised Carthy) family were located in Ui Maine, though apparently not members of the dynasty.

See also

 Ó Cárthaigh

References

 http://www.ucc.ie/celt/published/T100005B/
 http://www.irishtimes.com/ancestor/surname/index.cfm?fuseaction=Go.&UserID=

People from County Galway
People from County Roscommon
1067 deaths
Medieval Irish poets
11th-century Irish writers
11th-century Irish poets
Year of birth unknown
Irish male poets